Two Ring Circus may refer to:

 The Two Ring Circus, a 1987 remix album by Erasure
 "Two Ring Circus", a 1974 song by Peggy Sue
 "Two Ring Circus", a 1996 TV episode of Ellen

See also

 Circus